Phuwin Tangsakyuen (Thai: ภูวินทร์ ตั้งศักดิ์ยืน ; Chinese: 陈普明; born 5 July 2003) is a Thai actor under GMMTV. Phuwin began in his career as a child actor, debuting in the television drama. He gained popularity for playing the leading role of Pi Pattawee in 2021 Thai comedy boys' love series, Fish upon the Sky.

Early life and education 
Phuwin was born in Bangkok on 5 July 2003. After graduating Kindergarten- Year 4 from Ascot International School Bangkok. He attended his studies at Elementary School, Middle School and High School at Ruamrudee International School until Grade 11. He got a GED diploma and enrolled at Chulalongkorn University. He is currently studying in the Faculty of Engineering, major in Information and Communication Engineering (International Program)

Career

2014–2016 : Beginnings as a child actor 
Phuwin made his debut at the age of eleven in television drama. He appeared in his first television drama Sunshine My Friend (2014). Since then, he went on to play the younger characters of the lead roles in television dramas such as in Neung Nai Suang (2015), Mafia Luerd Mungkorn (2015), Sane Rai Ubai Rak  (2016). He has also performed in the Musical drama "The Sound of Music" at Muangthai Rachadalai Theatre.

2019-Present : Rising popularity 
Phuwin starred as main role in the Cause You're My Boy series (2019), playing the role of Morn. He then starred as one of the main role in the Science fantasy series The Gifted: Graduation (2020). He played the role of Third, possesses the potential of mind-reading. And in 2021, he has taken on his first lead roles in the comedy series Fish upon the Sky.

Filmography

Film

Television

Musical

Music video appearances

Hosting

Television commercial

Discography

Live performances

Awards and nominations

External links 
 Phuwin Tangsakyuen on Instagram
 Phuwin Tangsakyuen on Twitter
 Phuwin Tangsakyuen on Weibo

References 

Phuwin Tangsakyuen
Phuwin Tangsakyuen
Phuwin Tangsakyuen
2003 births
Phuwin Tangsakyuen
Living people